is a Japanese manga artist.

Biography
During elementary school, Furuya enrolled in the Osamu Tezuka Manga Correspondence Course and by the time he reached high school he had discovered a darker, more underground style.

He graduated from Tama Art University, where he majored in oil painting and developed an interest in sculpting and Butoh dance. During college his work evolved from figurative to eventually dealing more with abstract shapes.

In 1994, Furuya published his debut series Palepoli in the renowned alternative manga magazine Garo. After graduating from college, he initially planned to work as a full-time artist while doing illustrations on the side, but his success in manga shifted his focus. Soon after, he published the gag manga Short Cuts in the mainstream seinen manga magazine Weekly Young Sunday.

He was a regular contributor to the alternative manga magazine Manga Erotics F from its beginnings in 2001 on. For this magazine he created the manga Lychee Light Club, based on a stage play, about a group of middle school buys aiming to build an AI with cruel tactics has been adapted into a TV anime series.

Otherwise, since the 2000s, he has published in mainstream seinen and shōnen manga magazines of different publishers like Kodansha, Shogakukan, Shueisha and Shinchosha, but also drew a yonkoma series for the daily newspaper Yomiuri Shimbun and made a manga biography about Emperor Akihito's life for the weekly magazine Shūkan Post.

Reception 
Furuya's manga have been translated, among others, into English, French, German, Italian and Spanish.

While Furuya has not won any major manga awards so far, he was nominated or selected several times:

Works

Manga

Illustrations 

 Flowers

Films/plays

 ZOO (Screenplay, storyboards, character design)
  (Man in coffee shop)
  (Original work)
  (Original work)
  (Miyanishi)

References

External links
  Usagi Hitori Club (Usamaru Furuya's Blog)
  Usamaru Furuya Unofficial Web Site, Tokyo

1968 births
Living people
Manga artists from Tokyo
People from Tokyo
Tama Art University alumni